Halgan District is a district in the central Hiran region of Somalia. It is mostly inhabited by the Xawaadle.

References
Halgan district

Districts of Somalia